Russel Gartner (born 16 September 1955), also known by the nickname of "Frog eyes", is an Australian former rugby league footballer who played in the 1970s and 1980s. An international representative three-quarter, He played for Manly, Balmain and Easts in the NSWRFL premiership.

Biography
Gartner came from a family with a strong rugby league background with his father Jim and uncle Clive playing for the Canterbury-Bankstown Bulldogs, while his nephew Daniel Gartner would later play for Manly-Warringah and represent Australia.

A fast and tall  or er, Russel Gartner started playing first grade in the New South Wales Rugby Football League premiership in 1975 with the Manly-Warringah club. The following year he won his first premiership when he was part of the Sea Eagles' team that defeated Parramatta in the Grand Final. In 1977 Gartner was the League's top try-scorer with 17, three more than any other player in the premiership (North Sydney's Barry Wood and Gartner's former centre partner at Manly Bob Fulton who had joined Eastern Suburbs following Manly's 1976 premiership).

During the 1977 season, Gartner played two games for Australia in the 1977 World Cup. After making his debut for Australia from the bench in a 21-9 win France at the Sydney Cricket Ground on 11 June, Gartner was selected for the World Cup Final two weeks later against a strong Great Britain side, again at the Cricket Ground. There he scored a spectacular 65-metre solo try which was a catalyst to Australia's eventual victory. Surprisingly his two World Cup games in 1977 would prove to be Gartner's only appearances in the green and gold. Gartner is listed on the Australian Players Register as Kangaroo No.501.

In 1978, Gartner was again a stand out performer for the Sea Eagles, scoring 10 tries for the season (second only in the team to winger Tom Mooney who crossed for 11), and playing in their drawn Grand Final against Cronulla-Sutherland, before scoring two tries, the second being a 70-metre effort where Manly threw the ball wide from a scrum and Gartner easily out paced the Cronulla chasers despite going into the match having torn his hamstring while scoring in the Preliminary final win over Western Suburbs, in the 16-0 rout of the Sharks in the Grand Final replay played just two days later. Following his two try performance in the Grand Final replay, Gartner was a shock omission from the 1978 Kangaroo tour in which 7 of his team mates (fullback Graham Eadie, halfbacks John Gibbs and Steve Martin, hooker and Sea Eagles captain Max Krilich, five-eighth Alan Thompson, and forwards Ian Thomson and Bruce Walker) were selected to tour. An eighth team mate, hard hitting second rower Terry Randall, was also selected but declined to tour citing exhaustion due to injuries and Manly's arduous finals campaign which saw the Sea Eagles play 6 finals games in just 24 days. The coach of the Kangaroos was Manly coach Frank Stanton.

At the end of the 1981 season, Gartner transferred to the Eastern Suburbs club where he played for two years before moving to Balmain. He played on the wing for the Tigers in their 24-12 loss to Canterbury-Bankstown in the 1988 Grand Final, and was a non-playing reserve in their dramatic extra time loss to the Canberra Raiders in the 1989 Grand Final.

Russel Gartner retired from playing following the 1989 Grand Final.

References

External links
Russel Gartner at yesterdayshero.com.au
Russel Gartner at nrlstats.com
Russel Gartner at stats.rleague.com

1955 births
Living people
Australia national rugby league team players
Australian rugby league players
Balmain Tigers players
Russel
Manly Warringah Sea Eagles players
Rugby league centres
Rugby league players from Sydney
Rugby league wingers
Sydney Roosters players